Puerta Bonita is an administrative neighborhood (barrio) of Madrid belonging to the district of Carabanchel. The name of the neighborhood (Spanish for "beautiful gate") comes from a former iron gate of the quinta, which was accidentally destroyed in 1982. As of 1 February 2020, it has a population of 36,157.

References 

Wards of Madrid
Carabanchel